The Cohesion Fund (CF), one of the five European Structural and Investment Funds of the European Union, provides support to Member States with a gross national income (GNI) per capita below 90% EU-27 average to strengthen the economic, social and territorial cohesion of the EU.

The Cohesion Fund supports investments in the field of environment and Trans-European Networks in the area of transport infrastructure (TEN-T).

For the 2021–2027 period, the Cohesion Fund concerns Bulgaria, Croatia, Cyprus, the Czech Republic, Estonia, Greece, Hungary, Latvia, Lithuania, Malta, Poland, Portugal, Romania, Slovakia and Slovenia. 37% of the overall financial allocation of the Cohesion Fund are expected to contribute to climate objectives.

References

External links
Open Data Portal for the European Structural Investment Funds

Economy of the European Union
Regional policies of the European Union